The Voice is a European radio station operating in Denmark, Finland and Bulgaria. It was operating in Sweden until broadcasts stopped online early 2020. The Nordic radio stations are owned by Bauer Media Group, and the Bulgarian station is owned by A.E. Best Success Services Bulgaria EOOD. The format consists mostly of new Pop, RnB and Rock songs, real life events and on-air comedy. The target audience of the listeners is 15 to 25 years old. Income is generated by commercials. The station was founded in Denmark as a local radio in the Copenhagen area.

Important dates 
 8 June 1984 (12:00 pm) - The first The Voice station goes on air in Copenhagen, Denmark
 1 April 2004 - The Voice goes on air in and replaces Radio City in Stockholm, Sweden
 17 August 2004 - The Danish version of the TV-channel The Voice TV begins
 12 November 2004 The Finnish version of TV-channel The Voice TV begins
 17 December 2004 - The Swedish version of the TV-channel The Voice begins
 2005 - The Voice Radio launches in Norway
 2006 -  The Voice Bulgaria launches
 2007 - The Voice Radio launches in Finland
 30 September 2008 - The Voice TV was closed in Sweden
 10 November 2011 - ProSiebenSat.1 sells the Bulgarian division to A.E. Best Success Services Bulgaria EOOD.
 1 September 2012 - The Voice TV was closed in Finland and replaced by Kutonen
 14 December 2012 - Discovery Communications buys the SBS Nordic operations from ProSiebenSat.1 Group.
 31 December 2012 - The Voice TV was closed in Denmark and replaced by 7'eren
 2012 - The Voice TV was closed in Norway
 April 2015 - Discovery sells SBS Discovery Radio to Bauer Media Group.
 October 2015 - The Voice radio was closed in Norway and replaced by Kiss 
 29 April 2016 - In Sweden, The Voice radio was replaced by Kiss on FM, but remained as an online-only radio station.
 2020 - The Voice stops broadcasting online in Sweden.

Availability

Denmark 
The station is available nationwide on DAB radio and online, and on FM radio on the following frequencies:

Sweden 
The Voice was available nationwide as an online radio station it's now defunct since early 2020.

References

Radio stations in Bulgaria
Radio stations in Denmark
Radio stations in Finland
Radio stations in Norway
Radio stations in Sweden
Radio stations established in 1984
Defunct mass media in Sweden
Defunct mass media in Norway